The Barna Dam is a gravity dam on the Barna River in Badi tahsil Raisen district, Madhya Pradesh, India. Barna river is a major tributary of the Narmada River. Dam was constructed by Madhaya Pradesh Water Resource Department. The primary purpose of the dam is irrigation and it was completed in 18.oct.1978.

References

Dams in Madhya Pradesh
Dams completed in 1978
Gravity dams
Tourist attractions in Raisen district
1978 establishments in Madhya Pradesh
20th-century architecture in India